Antonina Elżbieta Petrykiewicz (born 1874, died 1966), better known as Nina Niovilla, was a Polish film director, screenwriter, actress, translator and a teacher. She was the first Polish female film director and the only female director of the silent film era in Poland.

Life 
She was born in 1874 in Lviv as Antonina Elżbieta Petrykiewicz. During World War I she made a living as a singer and an actress in Warsaw and Berlin.

In 1906 she had a daughter Ludwika Janina born in Lviv.

Niovilla was the first Polish woman to direct a film and – at the same time – the only female film director of the silent film era in Poland. She debuted in 1918 in Berlin, where she directed the movie Die Heiratsannonce, under a pseudonym Nina von Petry. Her first Polish film was Tamara, also known as Obrońcy Lwowa (1919), which she directed after returning to Poland. With its use of the Battle of Lemberg as the background of the plot, Tamara had a patriotic theme, which was a popular motif in Polish filmmaking at the time. As with all the films that followed, Niovilla wrote the script herself.

Her second Polish film was the melodrama Czaty – an adaptation of a ballad by Adam Mickiewicz about a jealous husband, which premiered on 20 November 1920. The rights to screen the picture were sold abroad. Around this time, Niovilla also performed in the Qui Pro Quo cabaret. Her next film, Idziem do ciebie, Polsko, matko nasza (1921) saw her return to patriotic themes. Niovilla’s final film was the melodrama Młodość zwycięża (1923), which she also produced. In 1926 the press informed that Niovilla was set to direct the film W szponach szakali based on a script by Kazimierz Krzyżanowski. None of her work has survived.

In 1926, Niovilla became one of the first international delegates of ZAIKS at the 35. ALAI Congress.

At the end of the 1920s she appeared in films and theatre plays directed by Danny Kaden (Niebezpieczny pocałunek), Edward Puchalski (Ludzie dzisiejsi), as well as Adam Augustynowicz and Ryszard Biske (9.25. Przygoda jednej nocy). She also taught acting. In 1919, she opened her own acting school in Warsaw called Warszawska Szkoła Gry Sceniczno-Filmowej and later opened its branches in Poznań, Vilnius, Lviv and Kraków. One of the school’s alumni was Aleksander Żabczyński.

Apart from working on films and teaching, Niovilla also translated theatre plays from English and French to Polish, which were then staged at, among others, the Polish Theatre in Warsaw, the National Theatre, the Teatr Nowy in Poznań and the Teatr Rozmaitości in Lviv. She also contributed to film magazines such as Sztuka i Film and Rewia Filmowa.

She left Poland in 1946 to join her daughter in Paris, where she died 20 years later. She was buried at the Batignolles Cemetery.

Works

Filmography 

 1918: Die Heiratsannonce
 1919: Tamara (also: Obrońcy Lwowa)
 1920: Czaty
 1921: Idziem do ciebie, Polsko, matko nasza
 1921: Z dni grozy
 1923: Młodość zwycięża
 1929: 9:25. Przygoda jednej nocy (acting), directed by Adam Augustynowicz and Ryszard Biske

Translations

Plays 

 Matka i córka (staged: 1908); Gaston Armand de Caillavet, Robert de Flers
 Familijka (1916, 1935); Eugene Holtai
 Mandaryn Wu (1926, 1927); Harold Owen, Harry Maurice Vernon
 Pociąg widmo (1926, 1928, 1956); Arnold Ridley
 Nieuchwytny (1928, 1933); Edgar Wallace
 Koniec pani Cheyney (1929); Frederick Lonsdale
 Niebieski lis (1930); Ferenc Herczeg
 Burza w domu panien (1941); Alex Breidhal

Novels 

 1939: Yang i Yin, Alice Tisdale Hobart; Warsaw: Towarzystwo Wydawnicze „Rój”

References 

1874 births
1966 deaths
Polish women film directors
Polish film directors
Polish screenwriters
Polish translators
Burials at Batignolles Cemetery
Polish women screenwriters
Women film pioneers
Polish emigrants to France